The Pachacámac District is one of 43 districts of the Lima Province in Peru. The capital of the district is the village of Pachacámac. Its main asset is the archaeological Inca site Pachacámac.

History
Pachacámac was first encountered by Hernándo Pizarro on January 30, 1530, while on his quest for gold and his search for a location of a new capital. In 1573 the city of Santísimo Salvador de Pachacámac was founded. In 1857, Pachacámac was founded as a republican district.

Location
The district is located in the southern part of the Lima province at an elevation of 75m.

Political division
The district is divided into 11 populated centers:

 Pachacamac
 Puente Manchay
 Tambo Inga
 Pampa Flores
 Manchay Alto Lote B
 Invasion Cementerio
 Manchay Bajo
 Santa Rosa de Mal Paso
 Cardal
 Jatosisa
 Tomina

Capital
The capital of the Pachacamac district is the village of Pachacamac.

See also 
 Administrative divisions of Peru

References

External links
  Official web site

Pachacamac
1857 establishments in Peru